Luigj Gurakuqi (also called Louis Gurakuchi; 19 February 1879 – 2 March 1925) was an Albanian writer and politician. He was an important figure of the Albanian National Awakening and was honoured with the People's Hero of Albania medal.

Biography

Early life
Gurakuqi was born in Shkodër, a vilayet center of the Ottoman Empire at the time, on February 19, 1879. He studied at the Jesuit-run St. Xavier College (currently known as Pjetër Meshkalla High School), where he was encouraged by teachers like Anton Xanoni and Gaspër Jakova Mërturi. As a student, he wrote poetry in Italian, Latin, and Albanian. In 1897, he left for Italy to study at the Italo–Albanian college of San Demetrio Corone (Collegio of Sant'Adriano) under Girolamo De Rada, who would exercise a strong influence on him. Gurakuqi also studied medicine in Naples for three years, but his interests were focused more on science and the humanities. In Naples, he came into contact with Arbëresh literary and political figures and published Albanian school texts and a book on prosody. He was also a poet and published under the pen name Jakin Shkodra and Lekë Gruda. He published articles in Albania, Drita, Kalendari-kombëtar, Liria e Shqipërisë, and La Nazione Albanese.

Albanian independence
In 1908, after the revolution of the Young Turks, Gurakuqi returned definitively to Albania and soon became a leading figure in the nationalist movement, which led to the country's independence in 1912. Together with Gjergj Fishta, he represented the Bashkimi (Unity) literary society of Shkodër at the Congress of Monastir in 1908, and, in September 1909, he attended the Congress of Elbasan, which was held to organize Albanian-language teaching and education. When Albania's first teacher-training college, Shkolla Normale (currently known as Aleksandër Xhuvani University), was set up in Elbasan on 1 December 1909, Luigj Gurakuqi was appointed its director. Gurakuqi took part in the uprising in the Malësori uprising in 1911, the uprising in southern Albania in 1912, and in March of that year traveled to Skopje and Gjakova to stir up support for open resistance to Turkish rule and the inclusion of Kosovo in a new Albanian state. By September 1912, Gurakuqi and Ismail Qemal bey Vlora traveled to Bucharest to consult with the large Albanian diaspora regarding Albanian geopolitical issues. Gurakuqi took part in the declaration of Albanian independence in Vlora on 28 November 1912 and served as minister of education in the first Albanian government, headed by Ismail Qemal.

Austro–Hungarian occupation
In 1915, when his native Shkodër was occupied by Montenegrin troops, Gurakuqi was taken prisoner and jailed in Montenegro until after the invasion of Austro–Hungarian forces. In 1916, he played a role in the Albanian Literary Commission on Albanian orthography, which also served to encourage the publication of Albanian language school texts. During the Austro–Hungarian occupation of Shkodër, he served as director general of education and assisted in establishing about 200 elementary schools.

Principality of Albania and Noli's Government
In 1918, Gurakuqi was again appointed minister of education in the newly formed Durrës government. The following year he attended the Paris Peace Conference. In 1921, he was appointed minister of the interior in the government of Hasan bey Prishtina. In 1924 Gurakuqi was one of the leaders of the revolution that overthrew the regime of Ahmet Zogu and established a democratic government. Fan S. Noli became the new Prime Minister, while Luigj Gurakuqi was part of the new cabinet as Minister of Economy and Finance. in the short-lived government. In August 1924, Gurakuqi traveled to Geneva to defend Albanian interests at the League of Nations, but with the overthrow of Fan Noli's democratic administration by the more authoritarian Zogu forces, he was forced to flee to Italy.

Exile and death
After the restoration of the Zogist regime, Gurakuqi lived in Bari, Italy, where he was murdered in a café by Baltjon Stambolla.

Legacy

Luigj Gurakuqi served the national cause not only by playing an active role in public life, but also by contributing informative articles to a good number of Albanian periodicals. He was, in addition, the author of both didactic and educational works and of poetry, much of which he published under the pseudonyms Lek Gruda and Jakin Shkodra. A collection of his verse, imbued with the strong patriotic emotion and sentimentality of romantic nationalism, was published posthumously in the 94-page Vjersha (Verse; Bari: Gjikam, 1940), by Gjon Kamsi.

Honors
Luigj Gurakuqi was awarded the titles Hero i Popullit (Hero of the People) and Mësues i Popullit (Teacher of the People). The town of Shkodra has always been proud of Luigj Gurakuqi, and on 29 May 1991, it named the newly founded university there after him. A statue of him stands in the center of Shkodër.

See also
 Albanian National Awakening
 History of Albania
 Politics of Albania

References

1879 births
1925 deaths
People from Shkodër
People from Scutari vilayet
Albanian Roman Catholics
Albanian revolutionaries
Heroes of Albania
Signatories of the Albanian Declaration of Independence
Government ministers of Albania
Finance ministers of Albania
Members of the Parliament of Albania
Academic staff of the University of Elbasan
All-Albanian Congress delegates
Government of Durrës
Congress of Durrës delegates
Activists of the Albanian National Awakening